The following is a list of notable deaths in March 1966.

Entries for each day are listed alphabetically by surname. A typical entry lists information in the following sequence:
 Name, age, country of citizenship at birth, subsequent country of citizenship (if applicable), reason for notability, cause of death (if known), and reference.

March 1966

1 
 Hugh Baillie, American journalist, head of UP (b. 1890)
 George William Chafer, English recipient of the Victoria Cross (b. 1894)
 Károly Csapkay, Hungarian footballer and manager (b. 1894)
 Arthur Henry Davey, New Zealand master mariner (b. 1878)
 Rick Decker, American race car driver (b. 1903)
 Karel Dostal, Czech actor (b. 1884)
 Adm. Sir John Eccles, English Royal Navy admiral (b. 1898)
 Fritz Houtermans, German physicist (b. 1903)
 William R. Munroe, American admiral (b. 1886)
 Donald Stewart, American-born English actor (b. 1910)

2 
 Vincent Fanelli, American musician (b. 1881)

3 
 Alfonso Castaldo, Italian Cardinal of the Roman Catholic Church, Archbishop of Naples (b. 1890)
 Peter S. Connor, American marine, received the Medal of Honor (b. 1932)
 Bernard Charles Cotton, English-born Australian malacologist (b. 1905)
 Joseph Fields, American playwright (b. 1895)
 Jack Fier, American film producer (b. 1896)
 William Frawley, American actor (I Love Lucy) (b. 1887)
 William Dickson Lang, British geologist (b. 1878)
 Maxfield Parrish, American artist (b. 1870)
 Alice Pearce, American actress (b. 1917)

4 
 Stanley Anderson, English artist (b. 1884)
 Joseph Fields, American playwright, theatre director, screenwriter, and film producer (b. 1895)
 Bernhard Grant, British philatelist (b. 1887)
 Thomas Loveday, British university administrator (b. 1875)

5 
 Anna Akhmatova, Russian poet (b. 1889)
 Robert John Hibbs, American soldier, Medal of Honor recipient (b. 1943)
 Sir Claude Liardet, British general during World War II (b. 1881)
 Charles Lomberg, Swedish decathlete, silver medalist at the 1912 Summer Olympics (b. 1886)

6 
 Louis-Mathias Auger, Canadian teacher and Liberal Party politician, member of the Canadian House of Commons (b. 1902)
 Charles F. Buddy, American Roman Catholic Bishop of San Diego (b. 1887)
 Giorgio Bulgari, Italian businessman (Bulgari) (b. 1890)
 Christian Günther, Swedish diplomat and politician, Minister for Foreign Affairs during World War II (b. 1886)
 Víctor Manuel Gutiérrez, Guatemalan labor leader (b. 1922)
 Richard Hageman, Dutch-born American pianist and composer (b. 1881)
 Gen. Leland Hobbs, American general during World War II (b. 1892)
 Spiridon Kacarosi, Albanian politician, head of the Albanian Secret Service (b. 1891)
 Enrique López Albújar, Peruvian writer (b. 1872)
 Michitaro Totsuka, Japanese admiral (b. 1890)

7 
 William Astor, 3rd Viscount Astor, English businessman and Conservative Party politician (b. 1907)
 Donald B. Beary, American admiral (b. 1888)
 Bill Cahill, Australian rules footballer (b. 1911)
 George Camsell, English footballer (b. 1902)
 Sir Nigel Colman, 1st Baronet, British politician, MP (b. 1886)
 Hilding Ekman, Swedish runner, competed at the 1920 Summer Olympics (b. 1893)
 Georg Faber, German mathematician (b. 1877)
 Spider Johnson, American football player (b. 1907)
 Yosef Leifer, Austro-Hungarian-born American rabbi (b. 1891)

8 
 Sir John Blake-Reed, British judge (b. 1882)
 Roger L. Dell, American jurist, Chief Justice of Minnesota (b. 1897)
 Roderick Falconer, English cricketer (b. 1886)
 Abdel Hadi Al Gazzar, Egyptian painter (b. 1925)
 Adán Gordón, Panamanian swimmer at the 1928 Olympics (b. 1906)
 Sir Norman Kendal, British barrister and police administrator (b. 1880)

9 
 John F. Baldwin, Jr., American politician, U.S. Representative from California (b. 1915)
 René Barbier, French fencer, silver medalist at the 1928 Summer Olympics (b. 1891)
 Pablo Birger, Argentine racing driver (b. 1924)
 George Cornell, English criminal (b. c. 1928)
 Gen. Sir Lewis Halliday, English Royal Marines general, recipient of the Victoria Cross (b. 1870)

10 
 Walter Heywood Bryan, Australian geologist (b. 1891)
 Émile Coulonvaux, Belgian lawyer and politician (b. 1892)
 Sophie Harris, English theatre and opera costume and scenic designer (b. 1900)
 Hubertus Hitschhold, German Luftwaffe pilot during World War II (b. 1912)
 Frank O'Connor, Irish writer (b. 1903)
 Frits Zernike, Dutch physicist, Nobel Prize laureate (b. 1888)

11 
 James Barnhill, American football official (b. 1921)
 James E. Fitzsimmons, American racehorse trainer (b. 1874)
 Ivan Greenberg, English journalist (b. 1896)
 Frank Hodgins, Australian rules footballer (b. 1888)
 W. M. Holland, American politician, mayor of Dallas (b. 1875)
 Willis Kent, American film producer (b. 1878)
 Jean Laigret, French biologist (b. 1893)

12 
 Victor Brauner, Romanian artist (b. 1903)
 George Caldwell, American builder (b. 1892)
 Sir Sydney Camm, English aeronautical engineer (b. 1893)
 Néstor Guillén, Bolivian politician, President of Bolivia (b. 1890)

13 
 Guido Bruck, Austrian numismatist (b. 1920)
 Max Clara, Italian-born German anatomist (b. 1899)
 Johnny Duncan, Scottish footballer (b. 1896)
 Henry R. Harmer, British philatelist (b. 1870)
 Frederick Lister, British Legionnaire (b. 1886 or 1887)
 Verner Magnusson, Swedish long-distance runner, competed at the 1920 Summer Olympics (b. 1890)

14 
 Leon Isserlis, Russian-born British statistician (b. 1881)
 Lee Magee, American baseball player and manager (b. 1889)

15 
 Osendé Afana, Cameroonian guerrilla (b. 1930)
 Ruth Dalton, British politician, MP (b. 1890)
 Yenovk Der Hagopian, Turkish-born American artist (b. 1900)
James Donahue, American pentathlete, silver medalist at 1912 Summer Olympics (b. 1885).
 Norman Augustus Finch, English sergeant in the Royal Marines, recipient of the Victoria Cross (b. 1890)
 Chappie Geygan, American baseball player (b. 1903)
 Henry D. Larcade Jr., American politician, U.S. Representative from Louisiana (b. 1890)

16 
 Joseph-Odilon Duval, Canadian politician, member of the Legislative Assembly of Quebec (b. 1895)
 Gavriil Gorelov, Russian painter (b. 1880)
 Lê Văn Đệ, Vietnamese painter (b. 1906)

17 
 Don Eagle, Canadian wrestler (b. 1925)
 Lindsay Merritt Inglis, New Zealand general and chief judge of the Allied Control Commission's Supreme Court in Germany after World War II (b. 1894)
 Santiago Lovell, Argentine boxer, gold medalist at the 1932 Summer Olympics (b. 1912)

18 
 Frank Bennett, American baseball player (Boston Red Sox) (b. 1904)
 Frank Gaha, Australian politician, member of the Australian House of Representatives (b. 1894)
 Arthur T. Hannett, American politician, Governor of New Mexico (b. 1884)
 Osvald Helmuth, Danish actor (b. 1894)
 Robert F. Hill, Canadian film director (b. 1886)

19 
 Erik Aaes, Danish set designer and art director (b. 1899)
 Josué Jéhouda, Russian-born Swiss writer and Zionist (b. 1892)

20 
 Laurence Abrams, English professional footballer (b. 1889)
 Demetrios Galanis, Greek artist (b. 1879)
 Anne Hocking, British writer (b. 1890)
 Johnny Morrison, professional baseball player (b. 1895)

21 
 Norman Coates, British army officer and politician, MP (b. 1890)
 Tom Fern, English footballer (b. 1886)
 Frank Finnan, Australian politician, member of the New South Wales Legislative Assembly (B. 1897)
 Ronald Acott Hall, British diplomat and politician (b. 1892)
 Sam Honaker, American football player (b. 1887)
 Solomon Clifford Joseph, British flying ace during World War I (b. 1893)

22 
 Bruno Bieler, German general during World War II (b. 1888)
 Horrie Brain, Australian rules footballer (b. 1885)
 Henry Bray, Australian rules footballer (b. 1891)
 Gen. Sir Dallas Brooks, British military commander, Governor of Victoria, Australia (b. 1896)
 Everett Glass, American actor (b. 1891)
 John Harlin, American mountaineer (b. 1935)
 Jacob Lestschinsky, Ukrainian-born American-Israeli statistician (b. 1876)

23 
 Peggy Allenby, American silent film, television, and radio actress (b. 1901)
 August Bach, East German politician (b. 1897)
 Bertil Bothén, Swedish sailor, competitor at the 1912 Summer Olympics (b. 1892)
 Fred T. Long, American baseball player and football coach (b. 1896)
 Marie Elisabeth Lüders, German politician, member of the Reichstag and of the Bundestag (b. 1878)

24 
 Carl Becker, German Wehrmacht general during World War II (b. 1895)
 Joseph Leonard Burley, Australian rules football executive (b. 1878)
 Albert Evans, English footballer and manager (b. 1874)
 Frederic Foley, American urologist (b. 1891)
 Virginia Hill, American organized crime figure (b. 1916)
 Morten Ansgar Kveim, Norwegian pathologist (b. 1892)
 Walter Lawrence, Australian politician, member of the New South Wales Legislative Council (b. 1895)
 Muhammad Ali Luqman, Yemeni writer and journalist (b. 1898)

25 
 G.R. Blanco White, English judge (b. 1883)
 Pravir Chandra Bhanj Deo, Maharajah of Bastar state (b. 1929)
 Venelin Ganev, Bulgarian politician and regent for tsar Simeon II of Bulgaria (b. 1880)
 Serafima Hopner, Soviet politician (b. 1880)

26 
 Wilhelm Engel Bredal, Norwegian politician, Member of Parliament (b. 1907)
 Morris Doob, American sports shooter, competed at the 1936 Summer Olympics (b. 1907)
 Robert Gibson, Canadian politician, member of the Legislative Assembly of Ontario (b. 1932)
 Victor Hochepied, French swimmer, competed in the 1900 Summer Olympics (b. 1883)

27 
 Sir Archer Baldwin, British Conservative Party Member of Parliament (b. 1883)
 Pannalal Bhattacharya, Bengali singer 
 Jan Čarek, Czech writer (b. 1898)
 Hermann Garrn, German footballer (b. 1888)
 Hermann Harrendorf, German general during World War II (b. 1896)
 Ragnar Josephson, Swedish art historian (b. 1891)
 Karl König, Austrian paediatrician (b. 1902)
 Helen Menken, American actress (b. 1901)

28 
 Roy Bell, New Zealand-Australian ornithologist (b. 1882)
 William W. Church, American football coach (b. 1874)
 Toni Edgar-Bruce, British actress (b. 1892)
 Buntarō Futagawa, Japanese film director (b. 1899)
 Max Ilgner, German industrialist, board member of IG Farben and convicted of spoliation and plunder after World War II (b. 1899)
 George Ward Linn, American philatelist (b. 1884)

29 
 Alfred Edwin Brain Jr., English-born American musician (b. 1885) 
 Knut Gard, Norwegian resistance leader (b. 1905)
 Jazz Gillum, American harmonica player (b. 1902 or 1904)
 Stylianos Gonatas, Greek politician, Prime Minister of Greece 1922-1924 (b. 1876)
 Dessaline Harris, Liberian jurist, member of the Supreme Court of Liberia (b. 1895)
 Albert-Édouard Janssen, Belgian banker and politician, Minister of Finance (b. 1883)
 Leon Lumsdaine, Chinese-born British athlete, competed at the 1952 Summer Olympics (b. 1923)

30 
 Frederick Gordon Bradley, Canadian and Newfoundland politician, member of the Canadian House of Commons and Canadian Senate, Secretary of State for Canada (b. 1886)
 Jelly d'Arányi, Hungarian violinist (b. 1893)
 Kim Jong-oh, South Korean soldier, president of the South Korean Military Academy (b. 1921)
 Sir Clutha Mackenzie, New Zealand politician, MP (b. 1895)
 Erwin Piscator, German theater director (b. 1893)

31 
 Grady Adkins, nicknamed "Butcher Boy", American professional baseball player (Chicago White Sox) (b. 1897)
 Fortunato Calcagno, Italian politician, member of the Chamber of Deputies (b. 1900)
 William David Doherty, English rugby player and hospital administrator (b. 1893)
 Arthur Robert Hogg, Australian physicist and astronomer (b. 1903)
 Samuel A. Levine, Polish-born American cardiologist (b. 1891)

References

1966-03
March 1966 events